Star Wars Rogue Squadron III: Rebel Strike is an action video game developed by Factor 5 and published by LucasArts for the GameCube. The game is set during the original Star Wars trilogy and recreates battles that take place during those films. The game follows the Rogue Squadron, which, under the command of Luke Skywalker and Wedge Antilles, uses starfighters to engage and defeat the Galactic Empire.

Rebel Strike was developed as a sequel to Star Wars: Rogue Squadron and Star Wars Rogue Squadron II: Rogue Leader. Rebel Strike added the ability for players to leave their starfighters to participate in ground battles as well as enter and pilot other vehicles during certain missions. The game also has a two-player multiplayer mode allowing cooperative play for all but two missions from Rogue Leader.

Gameplay

In Rebel Strike the player controls several Star Wars vehicles such as the X-wing and AT-ST across missions that span the movies and moments outside the films. It also contains on-foot missions in addition to the space battle missions found in the previous Rogue Squadron series games. The game also includes some unlockable classic missions inspired by the Star Wars original trilogy.

The game also features two multiplayer modes: Co-op and Versus. Co-op allows players to replay missions from Rogue Squadron II: Rogue Leader in split-screen, excluding the levels Triumph of the Empire and Revenge on Yavin. In Co-op, players share the same pool of lives. Versus features a variety of modes, such as Dogfight and Survival. In any Versus mode, players can pilot several craft, including X-Wings, A-Wings, TIE Fighters, and Darth Vader's TIE Advanced.

Plot
The story is set shortly after the destruction of the Death Star above Yavin 4. The Empire drives the Alliance off the moon, leaving the Alliance searching for a planet to serve as its next base. Tycho Celchu, an Imperial officer, defects to the Alliance on Dantooine and leads it to a group of scientists on Ralltiir who wish to defect. During the battle to rescue the scientists, Rogue Squadron member Sarkli defects to the Empire. Despite this, Rogue Squadron and the scientists escape safely in a transport craft. The Rebels settle on Hoth, but the Battle of Hoth forces them to leave as the Empire attacks and destroys their base.

The Wedge Antilles campaign takes place after the Battle of Hoth, leading a raid on Bakura to extract rebel hostages from the orbiting prison. Sarkli leads Rogue Squadron into Geonosis' orbit, where he and Wedge both crash following an ambush by TIE fighters and Imperial escort carriers. Wedge fights with stormtroopers and battle droid remnants. By making use of various pieces of deactivated Galactic Republic machinery left over from the Battle of Geonosis, he escapes and flees the system. This uncovers a ploy to wipe out part of the Alliance fleet over Dubrillion, and, in response, Rogue Squadron raids the shipyards of Fondor to destroy a Super Star Destroyer under construction. Emperor Palpatine reveals that the recent battles were manipulated, making the Rebels overconfident. This proves disadvantageous to the Rebels in the upcoming Battle of Endor. Nevertheless, Han Solo, having been rescued from Jabba the Hutt, disables the shield protecting the second Death Star over Endor while killing Sarkli, allowing the Rebels to achieve victory.

Development
The production team felt the need to expand upon the game's predecessor by adding enhanced atmospheric effects, more impressive explosions and the capability of having many more enemies on-screen at once than Rogue Leader could handle, among other improvements. The game ran into some troubled development. Because of the decision by Director of Technology Thomas Engel and Development Director Holger Schmidt to scrap all the coding of the engine for Rogue Leader so they could "reinvent the wheel" with the knowledge of the GameCube engine they had at that point, Factor 5 ran into various glitches as well as ultimately had various difficulties in development of a new landscape engine, causing it to go as long as tedious as in Rogue Leader, due to underestimating the amount of time it would take to do so.

In the United States and some European countries, anyone who pre-ordered the game would receive a special copy of the game with a playable version of the original Star Wars arcade game immediately unlocked (which is usually unlocked after completing a certain level or entering a pair of cheat codes), plus a bonus disc featuring demos and trailers for several upcoming games and a concept art gallery.

Reception

Rebel Strike was met with positive reception, as GameRankings gave it a score of 76.61%, while Metacritic gave it 75 out of 100.  Critics praised the intense gameplay and the ability to have more enemies on screen than on Rogue Leader. However, Rebel Strike was criticized for its on-foot missions, due to its clunky gameplay and lack of refinement.

References

External links

2003 video games
Cooperative video games
Factor 5 games
GameCube-only games
Games with GameCube-GBA connectivity
Multiplayer and single-player video games
Rebel Strike
Video games scored by Chris Huelsbeck
Video games developed in the United States
Video game sequels